Ivana Hong (born December 11, 1992 in Worcester, Massachusetts) is an American former artistic gymnast. She was a member of the gold medal American team at the 2007 World Artistic Gymnastics Championships and the all-around bronze medalist at the 2007 Pan American Games.  Hong was named an alternate to the 2008 U.S. Olympic team and was a member of the U.S. Women's Team in the 2009 World Artistic Gymnastics Championships in London.

Hong is of Chinese and Vietnamese ancestry. Hong lived in Blue Springs, Missouri, and trained at Great American Gymnastics Express (GAGE) for four years. She also trained under Valeri Liukin at the World Olympic Gymnastics Academy (WOGA). She competed for Stanford University from 2012 to 2016.

Elite career
Hong became a junior international elite in 2004 and qualified to her first United States Junior National Championships  at age eleven. She was named to the Junior National Team for the first time following the 2005 National Championships, a feat she repeated in 2006 after a fifth-place finish in the all-around.

Hong became a Senior International Elite in 2007. She was part of the gold-medal winning.U.S. team at 2007 Pan-American Games and won the bronze medal in the all-around competition. This and a strong showing at the 2007 Visa National Championships assured her place on the U.S. World Championships team, which again won the gold medal.

The following year, Hong was named to the 2008–2009 U.S. Senior National team, and was invited to the 2008 Olympic Trials. Hong's skill as an all-around athlete without a weak event enabled her to be named, along with Jana Bieger and Corrie Lothrop, as one of three alternates for the U.S. Olympic team.

Following the Olympics, Hong left her former gym and moved to WOGA to train with Valeri Liukin.

Hong finished second in the all-around at the 2009 U.S. National Championships with a total score of 117.250 in Dallas, Texas. She also won the national titles on the balance beam (with a combined score of 30.350) and the vault (combined score 29.950).

At the 2009 World Championships in London, Ivana scored a 14.550 on balance beam to win the bronze medal on that event. This made medalists of all four American gymnasts (Bridget Sloan, Kayla Williams and Rebecca Bross in addition to Hong) in the women's competition.

In early March 2010, Hong tore the anterior cruciate ligament in her right knee at the National Team training camp as she landed a vault.  She subsequently spent several months out of training, recovering from surgery.

Routines

Vault
Double Twist Yurchenko

-5.8 Difficulty (D) Score

Uneven bars
Mount on LB; Pike stalder 1/2 (D) Endo 1/2 (C) Toe shoot to HB (B); Pike stalder 1/1 (E) Tkachev (D) +0.2 Connection; Kip, cast to HS 1/2, Giant (B) Toe on 1/1 (D) Bail to HS on LB (D) Stalder shoot to HB [Ray] (C) +0.2; Giant, Giant, Double layout dismount (D)

6.0 D Score

Balance beam
Press to Handstand mount (B); Front aerial (D) Backhandspring (B) Layout stepout (C) +0.2; Full turn with leg at horizontal (C); Switch leap (C) Back tuck (C) +0.1; Onodi (D) Sheep jump (D) +0.1; Aerial cartwheel (D); Switch ring (E); Side somi (D); Split jump (A) Wolf jump (A); Backhandsrping (B) Backhandspring to 2 feet (B) Double pike (E) +0.2

6.4 D Score

Floor exercise
Pike full-in (E); 1½ (C) Rudi (C) +0.1; Split leap 1/1 (C); Double turn with leg at horizontal (D); Switch ring (C)...Switch side 1/2 (C); 2½ (D) Front layout (B) +0.1

5.5 D Score

References

External links

1992 births
Living people
American female artistic gymnasts
American sportspeople of Vietnamese descent
American sportspeople of Chinese descent
Gymnasts at the 2007 Pan American Games
Medalists at the World Artistic Gymnastics Championships
Pan American Games gold medalists for the United States
Pan American Games bronze medalists for the United States
Sportspeople from Missouri
Sportspeople from Worcester, Massachusetts
American sportswomen of Chinese descent
World Olympic Gymnastics Academy
Pan American Games medalists in gymnastics
People from Blue Springs, Missouri
U.S. women's national team gymnasts
Medalists at the 2007 Pan American Games
21st-century American women